Ören is a village in the District of Seydikemer, Muğla Province, Turkey. As of 2007 it had a population of 1,794 people. It is the site of the ancient city of Araxa.

References

Villages in Muğla Province